Club Deportivo Educación is a Peruvian football club, playing in the city of Abancay, Apurímac.

Rivalries
Deportivo Educación has had a long-standing rivalry with Miguel Grau.

Honours

National
Copa Perú: 0
Runner-up (1): 2003

Regional
Región VI:
Winners (3): 1999, 2001, 2003  

Región VIII:
Winners (1):  2005
Runner-up (1): 2006

Liga Departamental de Apurímac:
Winners (10): 1981, 1982, 1983 1988, 1994, 1999, 2001, 2002, 2003, 2006
Runner-up (4): 2005, 2007, 2008, 2009

Liga Distrital de Abancay:
Winners (15): 1983, 1984, 1988, 1994, 1999, 2001, 2002, 2003, 2005, 2007, 2008, 2009, 2011, 2015, 2019

See also
List of football clubs in Peru
Peruvian football league system

Football clubs in Peru
Association football clubs established in 1972